Blue Embrace is an American rock band formed in Hollywood, California in 2009. The group was founded by musician and music producer Oz Chiri.

History

The band began performing shows in theaters and clubs on Sunset Strip in Hollywood, along with other areas such as Los Angeles, Orange County and Inland Empire. They were signed in 2010 by the record label Tarot Records. They released their first album: "Bleeding Blue" the same year. Their second album "Fenix" (2010) received praise from Carmine Appice, and was considered by the Recording Academy for a Grammy award nomination for Best Rock Album.

In 2012 the band released their new single "Devil in Disguise", and made their first tour, to the US states Nevada, Colorado, Ohio, Texas, California, and abroad to the UK, Germany, and the Netherlands.

Musical style 
Blue Embrace's musical is variable and original with early influences from rock, blues and jazz. During the recording of Fenix, the band took a more progressive approach to their music, Devil in Disguise released in 2012 gave the band a more classical rock and blues approach. 2014 was the release of their Live Fan Appreciation single "Feel the Blues", recorded at Salamanca Studios in California during the Devil in Disguise sessions.

Personnel 
 Current members
 Oz Chiri — acoustic and electric guitars (2009–present)
 Mick Hanes — drums, percussion (2010–present)
 KP — lead vocals (2011–present)

Discography

Studio albums 
 Bleeding Blue (CD)(2009)
 Fenix (2010) (CD)

Singles 
 Devil in Disguise (2012) (iTunes)
 Feel the Blues (2014) (iTunes)
 Be My Queen (ETA Late 2017)

Music videos 
 Devil in Disguise, Official Music Video (Vevo)

Critical reception

Rock drummer Vinny Appice wrote: Blue Embrace’s ‘Fenix’ is refreshing with great grooves; music with a bad attitude! Their simple yet effective cool riffs remind me a bit of Zeppelin. They are not followers or trendy and I see a bright future ahead of Blue Embrace if they keep it metal with soul.

Rock singer Phil Lewis wrote: Blue Embrace have that edge and hunger that I recall the first time I saw a young Metallica. Loud abrasive yet soulful. I think were all going to be hearing a lot more about this band in the very near future.

Interviews 
 All Access Magazine Interview
 Music Notez Interview
 Skope Magazine
 IPM Nation Radio Interview

Live Sessions

Live at The NAMM Show 2017 (Zemaitis Guitars)

References 

  All Music
 Artist Direct
 
 Music Brainz
 All Access Magazine Interview

External Media 
 Music and Podcasts, Free and On-Demand Pandora Radio
 Blue Embrace Spotify
 Blue Embrace IHeart Radio

Rock music groups from California